Arya Rajendran S. (born 12 January 1999) is an Indian politician who currently serves as the mayor of the Thiruvananthapuram Corporation. She was elected from Mudavanmugal ward, belonging to Nemom Assembly Constituency from Communist Party of India (Marxist) at the age of 21 and was appointed as the mayor of the corporation which made her the youngest mayor in the country.

Personal life and education 
Arya Rajendran is the daughter of Rajendran, an electrician, and Sreelatha, an LIC agent. She did her schooling from Carmel Girls Higher Secondary School, Trivandrum. She is a second year B.Sc Mathematics student at All Saints College, Thiruvananthapuram. She is married to K. M. Sachin Dev, who is the member of Kerala Legislative Assembly from Balussery constituency.

Politics 
Arya Rajendran is the state president of Bala Sangham, the Kerala's largest children's organisation. She is a state committee member of Students' Federation of India and also serves as CPI(M)'s area committee member at Chala.

She was the candidate of Communist Party of India (Marxist) from Mudavanmugal ward in Thiruvananthapuram Corporation, the youngest candidate in 2020 civic body elections at the district. She defeated the UDF candidate Sreekala by 2872 votes.

Arya broke the record of Sabitha Beegum who became Kollam Mayor at 23 and Devendra Fadnavis by being the youngest mayor in India. Fadnavis became the mayor of Nagpur Municipal Corporation at the age of 27.

References 

1999 births
Living people
Mayors of places in Kerala
Politicians from Thiruvananthapuram
Communist Party of India (Marxist) politicians from Kerala
People from Thiruvananthapuram
Women mayors of places in Kerala
21st-century Indian politicians
21st-century Indian women politicians